Claude-Pierre Goujet (19 October 1697 – 1 February 1767), French abbé and littérateur, was born in Paris.

He studied at the College of the Jesuits, and at the Collège Mazarin, but he nevertheless became a strong Jansenist. In 1705 he assumed the ecclesiastical habit, in 1719 entered the order of Oratorians, and soon afterwards was named canon of St Jacques l'Hôpital. On account of his extreme Jansenist opinions he suffered considerable persecution from the Jesuits, and several of his works were suppressed at their instigation. In his latter years his health began to fail, and he lost his eyesight. Poverty compelled him to sell his library, a sacrifice which hastened his death, which took place at Paris on 1 February 1767.

He is the author of Supplement au dictionnaire de Morri (1735), and a Nouveau Supplement to a subsequent edition of the work; he collaborated in Bibliothèque française, ou histoire littéraire de la France (18 vols, Paris, 1740–1759); and in the Vies des saints (7 vols, 1730); he also wrote Mémoires historiques et littéraires sur le collège royal de France (1758); Histoire des Inquisitions (Paris, 1752); and supervised an edition of César-Pierre Richelet's Dictionnaire, of which he has also given an abridgment. He helped Jean Claude Fabre to complete Fleury's Histoire ecclésiastique.

See Mémoires hist. et litt. de l'abbé Goujet (1767).

Notes

References

External links
 

1697 births
1767 deaths
University of Paris alumni
18th-century French historians
18th-century French male writers
French religious writers
Jansenists
Oratorians
French lexicographers